Hawker is a surname. Notable people with the surname include:

Charles Hawker (1894–1938), member of the Australian House of Representatives from 1929 to 1938
Craig Hawker (born 1964), Australian chemist
Dave Hawker (born 1958), English former footballer
David Hawker (born 1949) member of the Australian House of Representatives since 1983
Edward Hawker (1782–1860), British Royal Navy admiral
Edward William Hawker (1850-1940), politician in colonial South Australia
George Charles Hawker (1818–1895), South Australian politician and pastoralist
George Stanley Hawker (1894–1979), Australian politician
Glenn Hawker (born 1961), former Australian rules footballer
Harry Hawker (1889–1921), Australian pioneering aviator, test pilot and founder of Hawker Aviation
Hugh Hawker, English Member of Parliament
James Hawker (died 1827), (British Army officer)
James Hawker (1836-1921), English poacher
James Collins Hawker (1821-1901), English-born explorer and settler in Australia
Lanoe Hawker (1890–1916), First World War English flying ace awarded the Victoria Cross
Lesley Hawker (born 1981), Canadian figure skater
Lilian Hawker (1908–1991), British mycologist
Lindsay Hawker (1984–2007), British murder victim
Lizzy Hawker (born 1976), British long-distance runner
Mary Elizabeth Hawker (1848–1908), English writer of novellas and short stories
Mike Hawker (born 1954), American Republican politician
Patience Hawker (1900–1994), co-founder of Stawell School for girls in South Australia
Phil Hawker (born 1962), English former footballer
Robert Hawker (1753–1827), Devonian vicar of the Anglican Church and noted preacher
Robert Stephen Hawker (1803–1875), English Anglican clergyman, writer and eccentric, grandson of the above
Thomas Hawker (died 1722), English portrait painter
Wilfred Hawker (1955-1982), Surinamese sergeant-major executed by the Surinamese government for leading a coup attempt

English-language surnames
Occupational surnames
English-language occupational surnames